Michael Riley (born 1962) is a Canadian actor.

Michael Riley may also refer to:

 Michael Riley (curler), Canadian curler
 Michael Riley (artist) (1960–2004), Indigenous Australian photographer and filmmaker
 Michael Riley (film producer) (born 1966), English film producer
 Michael Riley (Minnesota politician) (1874-1941), American farmer, businessman, and politician
 Michael H. Riley (born 1968), American motion graphics designer and art director

See also
 Michael Reilly (disambiguation)
 Mike Riley (disambiguation)